Flood is a 2007 British-Canadian disaster film, directed by Tony Mitchell. It features Robert Carlyle, Jessalyn Gilsig, David Suchet and Tom Courtenay and is mainly set in London, England. It is based on the novel of the same name by Richard Doyle.

Plot
A storm surge travels between the United Kingdom and mainland Europe, raising sea levels and coinciding with the spring tide. Several parts of Scotland are devastated, including Wick.

The Met Office's head forecaster, Keith Hopkins, mistakenly believes the storm will head towards the Netherlands and is guilt-ridden by Deputy Prime Minister Campbell when he critiques the failed forecasts. Professor Leonard Morrison proves that the approaching surge of water will break through the Thames Barrier and flood London in the next three hours. Leonard had focused his life around the belief that the barrier was built in the wrong area, and turned his son Rob (grieving from the death of his mother) into a bitter man. However, upon learning his father's obsession turned out to be truthful, Rob apologises.

Deputy Prime Minister Campbell, in charge while the Prime Minister is away, declares a state of emergency. He begins to evacuate over one million people from Central London before the water surge hits. He is assisted by Police Commissioner Patricia Nash, Major General Ashcroft and a guilt-stricken Hopkins.

The Thames barrier is raised, but the tsunami arrives and overwhelms the barrier. It sweeps into the city, destroying everything in its path. Rob and his ex-wife Sam, both expert engineers, jump into the Thames to escape. Leonard is saved by a military helicopter and taken to Whitehall, where the authority figures desperately require his assistance to handle the disaster.

Rob and Sam end up in the London Underground with other survivors. They are led through a ventilation duct to higher ground by two underground maintenance workers, Bill and Zack. When the surge floods the station, Bill is drowned sealing a door behind the others. The group find a ventilation shaft and escape the underground, finding themselves in the flooded Trafalgar Square, where Rob and Sam are able to contact Leonard. They end up returning with him to the barrier, where Leonard believes the water flow can be reversed back out of London, as the tide has turned and the water level is starting to go down. But General Ashcroft disagrees and prepares to destroy the barrier with an air strike.

Hopkins, feeling even more guilty when thousands of corpses are shown on a news report, quietly disappears and is later reported by Ashcroft to be dead, an apparent suicide. Nash is at odds with Ashcroft, wanting to give the Morrisons a chance to remedy the situation, while also distraught over her own two missing daughters, who later are found alive.

Rob, Sam and Leonard discover the controls to the Thames barrier are now underwater. One can activate them, but likely will not survive. Rob and Sam try to decide which of them should go, but Leonard leaves on the suicide mission. He saves London by activating the barrier's controls before running out of air whilst underwater and dying in the effort.

Campbell is informed that the Thames barrier has been activated and orders the air strike to be aborted. Rob and Sam lower the Thames barrier and the water flows back out of London.

Cast

Production 

The film was shot on location in London for two weeks and in South Africa for 11 weeks.  It is notable for the use of intricate production design and special effects in depicting famous London landmarks such as the London Underground, Houses of Parliament and The O2 being partially submerged under water.

Twenty-six studio sets were constructed with built-in water effects to shoot the actors in a wide range of flood sequences. Miniature sets in water tanks were used to shoot larger flooded buildings such as the Thames Barrier, London Underground and car parks. Computer generated visual effects were used to create shots of flooded London by combining shots of London with digitally created water. Locations in Cape Town were used for Whitehall, the Scottish coastline, London Underground and the Thames Barrier.

Release 
A 110-minute version of the film was given a limited theatrical release in the UK, premiering on 24 August 2007 and was released on DVD in the UK in October 2007. An extended two-part TV version was screened on ITV1 on May 4 and 5 2008 and released in the UK on DVD October 2008. It also played as a mini-series in Lithuania, Spain, Italy, New Zealand, South Africa, Canada, Finland and Denmark. The extended version was repeated on ITV3 on 10 and 11 January 2009.

Critical response 
Anna Smith  at the BBC gave the film 3 stars out of five with the reviewer calling it "an American disaster movie on rather sodden British soil."

References

External links 
 
 
 Risques VS Fictions n°8, filmed interview (subbed in French) with Steve East, technical support team leader of the real Thames Barrier about the depiction of the barrier and scientific accuracy in the film.

2007 films
British disaster films
British drama films
British science fiction films
Canadian disaster films
Canadian drama films
Canadian science fiction films
Films based on British novels
Films set in London
Films set in Scotland
Films set in the United Kingdom
Films shot in London
Films shot in South Africa
Flood films
2000s English-language films
Films directed by Tony Mitchell
2000s British films
2000s Canadian films